Mark Lehner is an American archaeologist with more than 30 years of experience excavating in Egypt. He was born in North Dakota in 1950. His approach, as director of Ancient Egypt Research Associates (AERA), is to conduct interdisciplinary archaeological investigation. Every excavated object is examined by specialists to create an overall picture of an archaeological site—from the buildings down to the pollen spores. His international team currently runs the Giza Plateau Mapping Project, excavating and mapping the ancient city of the builders of the Giza pyramid complex, which dates to the fourth dynasty of Egypt. He discovered that Pyramid G1-a, one of the subsidiary pyramids of the Great Pyramid, belonged to Hetepheres I; it was originally thought to belong to Queen Meritites I.

Education and career

Lehner first went to Egypt as a student in the 1970s. Intrigued by the mysteries of the "Sleeping Prophet", Edgar Cayce, Lehner "found that [my] initial notions about the ancient civilization along the Nile could not stand up to the bedrock reality of the Giza Plateau". He turned to the scientific method of discovery in order to understand the culture better, returning some years later to complete a doctoral degree at Yale University. Lehner's 1991 dissertation was titled Archaeology of an image: The Great Sphinx of Giza.

Lehner's team has more recently included parts of Menkaure's valley temple and the town attached to the monument of Queen Khentkawes in their excavations. AERA's 2009 field season was recorded in a blog. AERA has conducted a number of archaeological field schools for Egyptian antiquities inspectors under the auspices of Egypt's Supreme Council of Antiquities. The AERA team has run basic and advanced courses at Giza, as well as courses in salvage archaeology along the Avenue of Sphinxes north of Luxor Temple in the city of Luxor.

Among his other work in Egypt, Lehner has produced the only known scale maps of the Giza Sphinx.

Lehner's book, "The Complete Pyramids" (1997), is an exhaustive catalogue of Egypt's many pyramid sites. He has appeared in many television programs about Ancient Egypt.  He is a visiting assistant professor of Egyptian archaeology at the Oriental Institute of the University of Chicago.

Lehner took part in an American Association for the Advancement of Science debate centered around controversy surrounding the age of the Sphinx at Giza. 

Lehner has also starred and aided in the production of several documentaries about the pyramids which are regularly aired on the National Geographic Channel.

He has argued that the Giza Necropolis was built in a span of 85 years between 2589 and 2504 BC.

Television credits

Crew
Into the Great Pyramid (2002) (TV) (consultant: archaeology)
Mysteries of Egypt (1998) (scientific consultant)
Saving the Sphinx (1998) (TV) (historical consultant)

Appearances 
Pyramides: Les Mystères Révélés (2019) (TV)
Secret History Of The Sphinx (2017) (TV)
Riddles of the Sphinx  (2010) (TV)
Heritage Key: Pyramid Builders (2009) (TV)
Into the Great Pyramid (2002) (TV)
Secrets of the Pharaohs: Lost City of the Pyramids (2001) (TV)
Saving the Sphinx (1998) (TV)
Egypt: Secrets of the Pharaohs (1997) (TV)
Mummies: Tales from the Egyptian Crypts (1996) (TV)
The Mystery of the Sphinx (1993) (TV)
This Old Pyramid (1992) (TV)
Mysteries of the Pyramids, LIVE (1988) (TV)

Books
 The Egyptian Heritage: Based on the Edgar Cayce Readings, Virginia Beach: A.R.E. Press (1974). 
 The Complete Pyramids, Slovenia: Thames and Hudson (1997).

References

External links
AERA - includes links to Lehner videos at YouTube
The Giza Plateau Mapping Project at the University of Chicago's Oriental Institute

Scholars Dispute Claim that Sphinx is Much Older

American archaeologists
American Egyptologists
Living people
1950 births
American expatriates in Egypt